Bruno Zambrini (born 5 April 1935) is an Italian composer and record producer.

Born in Francavilla al Mare,  Chieti, Zambrini graduated in  composition at the Santa Cecilia Conservatory. In the 1960s he became a successful composer of pop songs, notably signing several hits by Gianni Morandi and Patty Pravo's "La bambola" Also active as a record producer, Zambrini composed many musical film scores, often collaborating with Andrea and Paolo Amati; he was nominated to  David di Donatello twice, in 2006 for Notte prima degli esami and in 2009 for Many Kisses Later.

References

External links 
 

 Bruno Zambrini at Discogs

1935 births
Italian film score composers
Italian male film score composers
People from the Province of Chieti
Italian record producers
Living people
Accademia Nazionale di Santa Cecilia alumni